Hans Straub (born 27 May 1928) is a Swiss sprint canoeist who competed from the late 1940s to the early 1960s. Competing in three Summer Olympics, he was eliminated in the heats or repechage rounds at all three games. Straub's best finish was fourth in the repêchage round of the K-1 4 × 500 m event at Rome in 1960

References

External links
  

1928 births
Canoeists at the 1948 Summer Olympics
Canoeists at the 1952 Summer Olympics
Canoeists at the 1960 Summer Olympics
Olympic canoeists of Switzerland
Possibly living people
Swiss male canoeists